Gary Shteyngart (born July 5, 1972) is a Soviet-born American writer. He is the author of five novels (including Absurdistan and Super Sad True Love Story) and a memoir. Much of his work is satirical.

Early life
Born Igor Semyonovich Shteyngart in the Soviet Union, he spent the first seven years of his childhood living in a square dominated by a huge statue of Vladimir Lenin in what is now St. Petersburg—which he alternately calls "St. Leningrad" or "St. Leninsburg".  He comes from a Jewish family, with an ethnically Russian maternal grandparent, and describes his family as typically Soviet. His father worked as an engineer in a LOMO camera factory; his mother was a pianist. When he was five, he wrote a 100-page comic novel.

Shteyngart immigrated to the United States in 1979 and was brought up in Queens, New York, with no television in the apartment in which he lived, where English was not the household language. He did not shed his thick Russian accent until the age of 14.

He is a graduate of Stuyvesant High School in New York City, and Oberlin College in Ohio, where he earned a degree in politics, in 1995, with a senior thesis on the former Soviet republics of Georgia, Moldova and Tajikistan.

Career
After Oberlin, he worked a series of jobs, as a writer, for non-profit organizations in New York.

Shteyngart took a trip to Prague in the early 1990s, and this experience helped spawn his first novel, The Russian Debutante's Handbook, set in the fictitious European city of Prava.

In 1999, as part of the application to Hunter College's MFA program he mailed a portion of his first novel to Chang-Rae Lee, the director of the creative writing program at Hunter College. Lee helped Shteyngart get his first book deal. Shteyngart earned an MFA in creative writing at Hunter College of the City University of New York. Shteyngart had a fellowship at the American Academy in Berlin, Germany, for Fall 2007. He has taught writing at Hunter College, and currently teaches writing at  Columbia University.

Awards
Shteyngart's work has received numerous awards. The Russian Debutante's Handbook won the Stephen Crane Award for First Fiction, the Book-of-the-Month Club First Fiction Award  and the National Jewish Book Award for Fiction. It was named a New York Times Notable Book and one of the best debuts of the year by The Guardian 

In 2002, he was named one of the five best new writers by Shout NY Magazine. Absurdistan was chosen as one of the ten best books of the year by The New York Times Book Review and Time magazine, as well as a book of the year by the Washington Post, Chicago Tribune, San Francisco Chronicle and many other publications. In June 2010, Shteyngart was named as one of The New Yorker magazine's "20 under 40" luminary fiction writers. Super Sad True Love Story won the 2011 Bollinger Everyman Wodehouse Prize for comic literature. His memoir Little Failure was a finalist for the 2014 National Book Critics Circle Award (Autobiography).

Work
Shteyngart's novels include The Russian Debutante's Handbook (2002), and  Absurdistan (2006). Super Sad True Love Story (2010) was promoted by a film trailer with Paul Giamatti and James Franco. Thirty-five years after he emigrated to the U.S., in January, 2014, Random House published Little Failure: A Memoir, and promoted it by a film trailer with James Franco and Rashida Jones. His 2018 book, Lake Success was promoted by a film trailer with Ben Stiller.

His fifth novel, Our Country Friends, was published by Random House in 2021. It is a story about friends who spend the pandemic together. His other writing has appeared in The New Yorker, Slate, Granta, Travel and Leisure, and The New York Times.

Blurbs
Shteyngart has also become known for his prolific blurbing, which has inspired a Tumblr website devoted to his Collected Blurbs, a live reading, and a fifteen-minute documentary narrated by Jonathan Ames.

Bibliography

Books

Novels
The Russian Debutante's Handbook (2002), 
Absurdistan (2006), 
Super Sad True Love Story (2010), 
Lake Success (2018), 
Our Country Friends (October 2021),

Non-fiction
 Little Failure: A Memoir (2014),

Essays and reporting

Personal life
Shteyngart is married to Esther Won, who is of Korean descent. They have a son, born October 2013. Shteyngart now lives in the Gramercy neighborhood of Manhattan. He spends six months out of the year at a house in northern Dutchess County, in the Hudson River Valley where he does nearly all of his writing.

References

Interviews

 Interview -  Program for Jewish Civilization - Georgetown University
 Interview 'On Meat over Meat: Dinner with Gary Shteyngart', published in Gigantic
Interview with Gary Shteyngart: On Travel Writing
 Rozalia Jovanovic. James Franco’s Face: A Subjective Account of the New Yorker Festival October 26, 2009
 Interview with Gary Shteyngart: On Stuyvesant High School
 Radio interview with Gary Shteyngart on CBC Radio One's Writers and Company
 In Conversation: 1984 2.0: Gary Shteyngart with Alessandro Cassin, The Brooklyn Rail
 Interview with Gary Shteyngart about Absurdistan - BOOKSWEB TV (English and Italian)
 "Gary Shteyngart Becomes American" - Jewcy Magazine
 Interview with Gary Shteyngart - Modern Drunkard Magazine 
 Interview at barnesandnoble.com
 Gary Shteyngart: Introducing a toilet Recorded at Louisiana Literature festival. Video by Louisiana Channel.

External links
 Walter Kirn. Review: "Absurdistan", by Gary Shteyngart – Russian Unorthodox, New York Times, April 30, 2006
 Zadie Smith & Gary Shteyngart at McNally Jackson

1972 births
Living people
American people of Russian-Jewish descent
Exophonic writers
Soviet emigrants to the United States
Oberlin College alumni
Hunter College alumni
Writers from Saint Petersburg
Stuyvesant High School alumni
Hunter College faculty
Columbia University faculty
Princeton University faculty
American satirists
Jewish American novelists
American male novelists
The New Yorker people
Novelists from New York (state)
Novelists from New Jersey
American male non-fiction writers
21st-century American Jews